Sighvatsson may refer to:

Þórður kakali Sighvatsson ( 1210–1256), Icelandic chieftain who fought in the Icelandic civil war during the Age of the Sturlungs
Arnór Sighvatsson (born 1956), Icelandic economist
Róbert Sighvatsson (born 1972), Icelandic handball player
Sigurjón Sighvatsson (born 1952), veteran Icelandic film producer and businessman, born in Reykjavík
Sturla Sighvatsson (1199–1238), Icelandic chieftain active in the armed conflicts in Iceland during the Age of the Sturlungs